Julia Kempe is a French, German, and Israeli researcher in quantum computing. She is currently the Director of the Center for Data Science at NYU and Professor at the Courant Institute.

Education and career
Kempe was born in East Berlin, to a family of Russian descent. She moved to Austria in 1990, and did her undergraduate studies in mathematics and physics at the University of Vienna from 1992 to 1995, with a year as an exchange student in physics at the University of Technology Sydney. She then earned two Master of Advanced Studies (DEA) degrees in France: one in mathematics in 1996 from Pierre and Marie Curie University and another in 1997 in physics from the École normale supérieure. She completed two doctorates in 2001. The dissertation for her Ph.D. in computer science from the École nationale supérieure des télécommunications was entitled Quantum Computing: Random Walks and Entanglement, and was supervised by Gérard Cohen. Her second Ph.D., in mathematics, was from the University of California, Berkeley, with a dissertation entitled Universal Noiseless Quantum Computation: Theory and Applications and was jointly supervised by Elwyn Berlekamp and chemist K. Birgitta Whaley.

She joined CNRS at the University of Paris-Sud in 2001
(overlapping with postdoctoral studies at Berkeley and the Berkeley Mathematical Sciences Research Institute), joined the Tel Aviv University faculty in 2007, and moved her CNRS position from Paris-Sud to Paris Diderot in 2010..  Between 2011 and 2018 she was a researcher in finance. She became director of the Center of Data Science at NYU and a professor at the Courant Institute in September 2018.

Awards and honors
In 2006, Kempe won the bronze medal of CNRS and the Irène Joliot-Curie Prize of the French government. In 1998 she received a reward from Studienstiftung des Deutschen Volkes (English: "German Academic Scholarship Foundation") which was awarded to only 0.25% of students at the time. She became a knight in the National Order of Merit in 2010. In 2018, she was elected to the Academia Europaea.

Selected publications
.
.
.
.
. Revised, SIAM Review 50 (4): 755–787, 2008,

References

Year of birth missing (living people)
Living people
21st-century German mathematicians
21st-century German physicists
German computer scientists
21st-century French mathematicians
21st-century French physicists
French computer scientists
21st-century women mathematicians
French women physicists
German women physicists
French women computer scientists
German women computer scientists
German people of Russian descent
People from East Berlin
University of Vienna alumni
Pierre and Marie Curie University alumni
École Normale Supérieure alumni
University of California, Berkeley alumni
New York University faculty
Knights of the Ordre national du Mérite
Quantum information scientists
Members of Academia Europaea